Jessie Evans (born October 24, 1950) is the former head men's basketball coach at the University of San Francisco. He was replaced by Eddie Sutton on December 26, 2007. He previously held the same position at the University of Louisiana at Lafayette.

He was Lute Olson’s chief recruiter at Arizona. He recruited almost 20 future NBA players in his 10 years at Arizona, including most of the 1997 National Championship Team. Following winning the National Title at Arizona, Evans accepted the head coaching job at Louisiana Lafayette.He left ULL for the University of San Francisco head coaching job after the 2003-2004 season. In 2012, Evans was hired as an assistant men's basketball coach at Southeast Missouri State University, where he served for two seasons. Evans was a finalist for the Tennessee State head coaching job in Nashville.

References

1950 births
Living people
Arizona Wildcats men's basketball coaches
Basketball coaches from Tennessee
Basketball players from Tennessee
College men's basketball head coaches in the United States
Eastern Michigan Eagles men's basketball players
High school basketball coaches in the United States
Louisiana Ragin' Cajuns men's basketball coaches
Minnesota Golden Gophers men's basketball coaches
People from Lebanon, Tennessee
San Diego State Aztecs men's basketball coaches
San Francisco Dons men's basketball coaches
Southeast Missouri State Redhawks men's basketball coaches
Texas Longhorns men's basketball coaches
Wyoming Cowboys basketball coaches